Suzanne Estelle Apoil (19 October 1825 – 28 June 1902) was a French porcelain painter and watercolorist.

Biography 
Suzanne Estelle Apoil was the daughter of Antoine Béranger, a painter at the Manufacture de Sèvres and sister of the painters Charles Béranger and Jean-Baptiste Antoine Emile Béranger. She was the wife of the painter Charles Alexis Apoil (1809-1864).  She studied with her father.

As a porcelain painter for the Manufacture nationale de Sèvres, she received a 3rd class medal at the Salon of 1846, and a 3nd class medal in the 1848 Salon. In 1874, the French government commissioned her to produce two vases, to be given to the Empress of all the Russias.

Apoil exhibited at the World's Columbian Exposition in Chicago in 1893.

She was buried at the Sèvres cemetery, beside her husband's and her father's graves.

Collections 
Château de Dieppe 
Collection du Mobilier national, France
Musée des arts décoratifs, Paris
Musée national de Céramique
Musée d'Orsay, Paris
Réunion des Musées Nationaux Grand Palais, Sèvres
Victoria and Albert Museum, London

References 

20th-century French women artists
20th-century French painters
Porcelain painters
1825 births
People from Sèvres
1902 deaths